Garden of the Moon may refer to:

 Garden of the Moon (album), an album by Lana Lane
 Garden of the Moon (film), a 1938 American comedy film